Azabnagar  is a village in Chanditala I community development block of Srirampore subdivision in Hooghly district in the Indian state of West Bengal.

Geography

Gram panchayat
Villages and census towns in Masat gram panchayat are: Aushbati, Azabnagar, Banamalipur, Chhunche, Krishnanagar and Masat.

Demographics
As per 2011 Census of India, Azabnagar had a total population of 1,021 of which 427 (42%) were males and 594 (58%) were females. Population below 6 years was 142. The total number of literates in Azabnagar was 674 (76.68% of the population over 6 years).

References 

Villages in Chanditala I CD Block